Transportation in Sweden is carried out by car, bus, train, tram, boat or aeroplane.

Railways in Sweden

Rail transport is operated by SJ, DSBFirst, Green Cargo, Vy Tåg and more. Most counties have companies that do ticketing, marketing and financing of local passenger rail, but the actual operation are done by the above-mentioned companies.

Total: 11,663 km (includes 3,594 km of privately (in fact county) owned railways) or 9227 km of national railways
standard gauge: 11,568 km  gauge (7,531 km electrified and 1,152 km double track) (2008)
narrow gauge: 65 km of  gauge (2008)
 Trains generally keep to the left, as opposed to all neighbouring countries.

Light rail and metros

Stockholm Metro (Stockholms Tunnelbana) is the only metro system in Sweden.

Cities with light rail (trams);
 Gothenburg: Gothenburg tram – consisting of 190 km on a total track length of 161 km
 Norrköping: Norrköping tramway – small but growing 
 Stockholm: Tvärbanan, Nockebybanan, Lidingöbanan, Spårväg City
 Lund – Lund tramway

Stockholm previously had a large tram network, but this was discontinued in favour of bus and metro; a revival of the tram network was seen in the construction of Tvärbanan in the late 1990s and early 2000s.

Railway links with adjacent countries
  Norway at Kornsjø (Gothenburg-Oslo), Charlottenberg/Eda (Stockholm-Oslo), Storlien (Östersund-Trondheim, not electrified Storlien-Trondheim) and Riksgränsen (Narvik-Kiruna) 
 same gauge – same voltage – same protection system. Most Swedish and Norwegian rail vehicles can cross the border. As there is only single-track at all border crossings, there is no need for bridges to make the transition from left- to right-hand traffic.
  Finland at Tornio/Haparanda 
 break-of-gauge / – other protection system. All freight has to be reloaded. No passenger traffic by rail.
  Denmark at Öresund bridge 
 same gauge – voltage change 15kVAC/25kVAC – other protection system. Only custom made locomotives or EMUs can cross the border. Bridges to make the transition from left- to right-hand traffic, are located north of Malmö, so all traffic south of Malmö is in right-hand traffic.

Road traffic

Sweden has right-hand traffic today like all its neighbours.

Sweden had left-hand traffic (Vänstertrafik in Swedish) from approximately 1736 and continued to do so until 1967. Despite this virtually all cars in Sweden were actually left-hand drive and the neighbouring Nordic countries already drove on the right, leading to mistakes by visitors. The Swedish voters rejected a change to driving on the right in a referendum held in 1955.

Nevertheless, in 1963 the Riksdag passed legislation ordering the switch to right-hand traffic. The changeover took place on a Sunday morning at 5am on September 3, 1967, which was known in Swedish as Dagen H (H-Day), the 'H' standing for Högertrafik or right-hand traffic.

Since Swedish cars were left-hand drive, experts had suggested that changing to driving on the right would reduce accidents, because drivers would have a better view of the road ahead. Indeed, fatal car-to-car and car-to-pedestrian accidents did drop sharply as a result. This was likely due to drivers initially being more careful and because of the initially very low speed limits, since accident rates soon returned to nearly the same as earlier.

Total roadways: 572,900 km, as of 2009.

Motorways
Motorways run through Sweden, Denmark and over the Öresund Bridge to Stockholm, Gothenburg, Uppsala and Uddevalla. The system of motorways is still being extended. The longest continuous motorways are Värnamo-Gävle (E4; 585 km) and Norwegian border - Vellinge (E6; 482 km; as the motorway between Trelleborg and Oslo in Norway has been completed in 2015).

Ports and harbours
Gothenburg
Gävle
Halmstad
Helsingborg
Hudiksvall
Kalmar
Kapellskär
Karlshamn
Karlskrona
Lidköping
Malmö
Norrköping
Nynäshamn
Stockholm
Sundsvall
Sölvesborg
Trelleborg
Varberg
Västerås
Waterways: 2,052 km (2010)
note: navigable for small steamers and barges

Merchant marine
total: 135 ships ( or over) totaling /
ships by type: (2010)
bulk carrier 4
cargo ship 26
carrier 1
chemical tanker 15
passenger 5
passenger/cargo 36
petroleum tanker 11
roll-on/roll-off 30
vehicle carrier 17

Airports

230 (2012)

Airports with paved runways
(Official figures. A great number of wartime airfields exist with various lengths, usually built into roads, and are usually less than 1000 m long)
total: 149
over 3,047 m: 3 (Arlanda, Landvetter, Luleå)
2,438 to 3,047 m: 12
1,524 to 2,437 m: 74
914 to 1,523 m: 23
under 914 m: 37 (2012)

Airports with unpaved runways
total: 81
914 to 1,523 m: 5
under 914 m: 76 (2012)
Heliports
2 (2012) (Every hospital, airport and military base has Helipads.)

List of airports
Gothenburg City Airport
Göteborg Landvetter Airport
Jönköping Airport
Luleå Airport
Malmö Airport
Stockholm-Arlanda Airport
Stockholm-Bromma Airport
Stockholm-Skavsta Airport
Umeå Airport
Växjö Airport – Smaland Airport

Pipelines

See also
 Sweden
 Government agencies in Sweden
 Scandinavian Airlines
 Volvo, Saab Automobile, Saab, Scania
 Estonia disaster
 Transport in Denmark
 Transport in Finland
 Transport in Iceland
 Transport in Norway

References
CIA World Factbook 2010

External links

resrobot.se, Search engine for all public transport inside Sweden including air